The 2021–22 season was Crewe Alexandra's 145th year in their history, their 98th in the Football League and second consecutive season in League One. Along with the league, the club also competed in the FA Cup, the EFL Cup and the EFL Trophy. The season covered the period from 1 July 2021 to 30 June 2022. Crewe's relegation to League Two was confirmed following a 2–0 defeat at Doncaster on 9 April 2022.

Pre-season friendlies
Crewe Alexandra announced they would play friendlies against Nantwich Town, Witton Albion, Ashton United, Wolverhampton Wanderers, Stoke City, Kidsgrove Athletic, Nottingham Forest, Oldham Athletic, Wolverhampton Wanderers U23s and Huddersfield Town as part of their pre-season preparations.

The scheduled friendly against Huddersfield Town was later cancelled due to Town's involvement in the EFL Cup.

Competitions

League One

League table

Results summary

Results by matchday

Matches
Crewe's fixtures were announced on 24 June 2021.

FA Cup

Crewe were drawn at home to Swindon Town in the first round.

EFL Cup

Crewe Alexandra were drawn away to Hartlepool United in the first round and Leeds United in the second round.

EFL Trophy

Cheshire Senior Cup

Crewe were drawn at home against Sandbach United in the first round.

Transfers

Transfers in

Loans in

Loans out

Transfers out

References

Crewe Alexandra
Crewe Alexandra F.C. seasons